is a Japanese former long jumper who competed in the 1968 Summer Olympics. He won the long jump at the 1967 Summer Universiade, as well as a national title in the 100 metres at the 1965 Japan Championships in Athletics.

References

1945 births
Living people
Japanese male long jumpers
Japanese male sprinters
Olympic male long jumpers
Olympic athletes of Japan
Athletes (track and field) at the 1968 Summer Olympics
Universiade medalists in athletics (track and field)
Universiade gold medalists for Japan
Medalists at the 1967 Summer Universiade
Japan Championships in Athletics winners
20th-century Japanese people
21st-century Japanese people